Cora auriculeslia is a species of basidiolichen in the family Hygrophoraceae. It was formally described as a new species in 2016 by Bibiana Moncada, Alba Yánez-Ayabaca, and Robert Lücking. The specific epithet auriculeslia alludes to the ear-shaped lobes of the lichen, and adds the second name of mycologist David Leslie Hawksworth. It is known to occur only from the type locality near Quito in Ecuador, where it grows on the ground in the shade.

References

auriculeslia
Lichen species
Lichens described in 2016
Lichens of Ecuador
Taxa named by Robert Lücking
Basidiolichens